Fornicatus is an extinct genus of ground shark from the Early Cretaceous age of Austria. There is only one known species, F. austriacus, named by Iris Fuchs in 2018. It was related to Altusmirus.

References

Carcharhiniformes
Prehistoric shark genera
Fossil taxa described in 2018